State Route 215 (SR 215) is a  state highway that runs northwest-to-southeast through portions of Dooly, Wilcox, and Ben Hill counties in the central part of the U.S. state of Georgia.

Route description

SR 215 begins at an intersection with SR 27 in the eastern part of Vienna, in Dooly County. It heads east to an interchange with Interstate 75 (I-75) on the extreme eastern edge of town. It heads southeast to an intersection with SR 257. Then, it enters Wilcox County. The highway continues southeast to an intersection with US 280/SR 30 (7th Avenue W.) in Pitts. The three highways run concurrent to the east. In Rochelle, the highways intersect SR 112/SR 233 (Ashley Street). Here, US 280/SR 30 depart to the east on 1st Avenue, while SR 215 turns south onto SR 112/SR 233 for about five blocks. At the end of the concurrency, SR 112/SR 233 continue south on Ashley Street, while SR 215 heads east on 5th Avenue. It continues to the southeast and enters Ben Hill County. Shortly after entering the county it meets its eastern terminus, an intersection with SR 90 northwest of Fitzgerald.

Major intersections

See also

References

External links

 Georgia Roads (Routes 201 - 220)

215
Transportation in Dooly County, Georgia
Transportation in Wilcox County, Georgia
Transportation in Ben Hill County, Georgia